We're All Going to the World's Fair is a 2021 American coming-of-age horror film written, directed, and edited by Jane Schoenbrun. The film stars Anna Cobb in her debut role and Michael J. Rogers.  David Lowery served as an executive producer.

The film had its world premiere at the 2021 Sundance Film Festival on January 31, 2021. It was then released in U.S. theaters by Utopia on April 15, 2022, and streaming on HBO Max on September 1, 2022.

Plot
Casey is a lonely teenage girl who lives with her widower father. One day, she decides to record herself taking the viral "World's Fair Challenge", in which she states, "I want to go to the World's Fair", three times on camera, smears some of her blood on her laptop computer screen and watches a short strobe light video, before saying she will make updates on any "changes" she notices.

Other World's Fair challengers record and post their own psychological and physical changes. Casey's next video recounts bouts of sleepwalking she experienced when she was younger, saying she is begun feeling similarly since taking the challenge. Late one night, she sneaks into her shed, where she finds her father's shotgun. She then watches an ASMR video of a young woman calming someone after a nightmare before a disturbing video made to her from user "JLB" plays, featuring Casey's distorted face along with the messages "YOU ARE IN TROUBLE" and "I NEED TO TALK TO YOU."

Casey reaches out to JLB, a collaborator with other World's Fair challengers, and speaks with him over Skype. JLB claims to worry about the symptoms Casey reported in her last post, and he encourages her to keep making videos so he can monitor her wellbeing. JLB is revealed to be an equally lonely middle-aged man who spends his time watching other people's World's Fair videos.

JLB watches another video of Casey's that she recorded while she slept, during which she appears to pull herself out of bed with a menacing smile. JLB informs her through another personal video that the forces behind the World's Fair are taking her over, and that she should continue posting videos. Casey's mental state begins to deteriorate, which becomes apparent in the stream of videos she continues posting online, including one where she inexplicably screams in terror while recording herself singing and dancing to a song, and then another later one where she states her intention to either murder her father with his gun or kill herself.

In her next video, she covers her face and arms in glow paint in her blacklit bedroom and tears apart the stuffed animal she's slept with since she was a newborn. She then appears to come to, becoming distraught over her toy's destruction. In her next conversation with JLB, he asks to "go out of game" and admits he continues to worry about her and says he once considered calling the police over her videos' content. Casey seems surprised by JLB's statement that the Fair is just a game, but quickly regains her composure and angrily asserts that her videos were not real, that she was only playing along with the challenge, and that Casey isn't even her real name. She cuts off contact with him, and he tries in vain to convince her to continue making videos.

One year later, JLB recounts having been contacted by Casey, whom he meets in person and eventually befriends in New York City where she's currently living. It is not confirmed whether this meeting actually happened or not.

Cast
 Anna Cobb as Casey
 Michael J. Rogers as JLB
A number of performers appear in various real and staged YouTube videos, including Theo Anthony, Evan Santiago, May "NyxFears" Leitz,  and the ASMR content creator Slight Sounds.<ref>{{cite web|url=https://seventh-row.com/2021/02/03/jane-schoenbrun-were-all-going-to-the-worlds-fair//|title=Jane Schoenbrun wants We're All Going to the World's Fair to 'scare you and make you cry|website=Seventh Row|first=Orla|last=Smith|date=February 3, 2020|access-date=February 12, 2021}}</ref>

Release
The film had its premiere in the 2021 Sundance Film Festival on January 31, 2021 in the Next section.

The film had its Asian Premiere at the 2021 Perspectives Film Festival on October 21, 2021 in Singapore.

Reception
 Box office 
In the United States and Canada, the film earned $12,750 from three theaters in its opening weekend.

 Critical response 
On Rotten Tomatoes, the film has an approval rating of 91% based on reviews from 64 critics, with an average rating of 7.5/10. The critics consensus reads: "Narratively challenging and visually haunting, We're All Going to the World's Fair'' adds a uniquely ambitious and unsettling entry to the crowded coming-of-age genre." On Metacritic, the film has a rating of 79 out of 100 based on 15 reviews, indicating "generally favorable reviews."

Many reviewers praised the film's evocation of gender dysphoria through horror. Of this, Schoenbrun, who is nonbinary, has said that they were trying "to do something that felt truthful to [their] coming-out process."

References

External links
 

2021 horror films
2021 independent films
2021 LGBT-related films
2020s American films
2020s English-language films
American coming-of-age films
American independent films
American teen horror films
American teen LGBT-related films
LGBT-related coming-of-age films
LGBT-related horror films
Films about social media
Transgender-related films